Vukas is a surname. Notable people with the name include:

Bernard Vukas (1927–1983), Yugoslav footballer
Hari Vukas (born 1972), Croatian football manager and footballer
Ivan Vukas (born  1979), Croatian handball player
Saša Vukas (born 1976), Croatian basketball player
 Budislav Vukas (born 1938), Croatian jurist

See also
Vuka (disambiguation) 
Vukašin

Croatian surnames